The GOST hash function, defined in the standards GOST R 34.11-94 and GOST 34.311-95 is a 256-bit cryptographic hash function. It was initially defined in the Russian national standard GOST R 34.11-94 Information Technology – Cryptographic Information Security – Hash Function. The equivalent standard used by other member-states of the CIS is GOST 34.311-95.

This function must not be confused with a different Streebog hash function, which is defined in the new revision of the standard GOST R 34.11-2012.

The GOST hash function is based on the GOST block cipher.

Algorithm

GOST processes a variable-length message into a fixed-length output of 256 bits. The input message is broken up into chunks of 256-bit blocks (eight 32-bit little endian integers); the message is padded by appending as many zeros to it as are required to bring the length of the message up to 256 bits. The remaining bits are filled up with a 256-bit integer arithmetic sum of all previously hashed blocks and then a 256-bit integer representing the length of the original message, in bits.

Basic notation 

The algorithm descriptions uses the following notation:
  — j-bit block filled with zeroes.
  — length of the M block in bits modulo 2256.
  — concatenation of two blocks.
  — arithmetic sum of two blocks modulo 2256.
  — logical xor of two blocks.

Further we consider that the little-order bit is located at the left of a block, and the high-order bit at the right.

Description 

The input message  is split into 256-bit blocks . In the case the last block  contains less than 256 bits, it is prepended left by zero bits to achieve the desired length.

Each message block, starting the first one, is processed by the step hash function , to calculate intermediate hash value
 

After  is calculated, the final hash value is obtained in the following way
 , where L — is the length of the message M in bits modulo 
 , where K — is 256-bit control sum of M: 

The  is the desired value of the hash function of the message M.

So, the algorithm works as follows.

 Initialization:
  — Initial 256-bit value of the hash function, determined by user.
  — Control sum
  — Message length
 Compression function of internal iterations: for i = 1 … n — 1 do the following (while ):
    – apply step hash function
     – recalculate message length
     – calculate control sum
 Compression function of final iteration:
     – calculate the full message length in bits
  – pad the last message with zeroes
     – update control sum
   – process the last message block
     – MD – strengthen up by hashing message length
  – hash control sum

Step hash function 
The step hash function  maps two 256-bit blocks into one: .

It consist of three parts:

 Generating of keys 
 Enciphering transformation  using keys 
 Shuffle transformation

Key generation 
The keys generating algorithm uses:

 Two transformations of 256-bit blocks:
 Transformation , where  are 64-bit sub-blocks of Y.
 Three constants:
 C2 = 
 C3 = 
 C4 = 

The algorithm:
 
 For j = 2, 3, 4 do the following:

Enciphering transformation 
Let's denote the enciphering transformation as E (enciphering 64-bit data using 256-bit key).
 
 
 
 
After this, the result blocks are concatenated into one 256-bit block: .

Shuffle transformation 
In the result, the intermediate hash value  is obtained.

First we define the ψ function, doing LFSR on a 256-bit block:
 ,
where  are 16-bit sub-blocks of the Y.

Initial values 
There are two commonly used sets of initial parameters for GOST R 34.11 94. 
The starting vector for both the sets is
  = .

Although the GOST R 34.11 94 standard itself doesn't specify the algorithm initial value  and S-box of the enciphering transformation , but uses the following "test parameters" in the samples sections.

"Test parameters" S-box 
RFC 5831 specifies only these parameters, but RFC 4357 names them as "test parameters" and does not recommend them for use in production applications.

CryptoPro S-box 
The CryptoPro S-box comes from "production ready" parameter set developed by CryptoPro company, it is also specified as part of RFC 4357, section 11.2.

Cryptanalysis
In 2008, an attack was published that breaks the full-round GOST hash function. The paper presents a collision attack in 2105 time, and first and second preimage attacks in 2192 time (2n time refers to the approximate number of times the algorithm was calculated in the attack).

GOST hash test vectors

Hashes for "test parameters"
The 256-bit (32-byte) GOST hashes are typically represented as 64-digit hexadecimal numbers.

Here are test vectors for the GOST hash with "test parameters"

 GOST("The quick brown fox jumps over the lazy og") =
  77b7fa410c9ac58a25f49bca7d0468c9296529315eaca76bd1a10f376d1f4294

Even a small change in the message will, with overwhelming probability, result in a completely different hash due to the avalanche effect. For example, changing  to :

 GOST("The quick brown fox jumps over the lazy og") =
  a3ebc4daaab78b0be131dab5737a7f67e602670d543521319150d2e14eeec445

Two samples coming from the GOST R 34.11-94 standard:

 GOST("This is message, length=32 bytes") =
  b1c466d37519b82e8319819ff32595e047a28cb6f83eff1c6916a815a637fffa
 
 GOST("Suppose the original message has length = 50 bytes") =
  471aba57a60a770d3a76130635c1fbea4ef14de51f78b4ae57dd893b62f55208

More test vectors:
 GOST("") =
  ce85b99cc46752fffee35cab9a7b0278abb4c2d2055cff685af4912c49490f8d
 
 GOST("a") =
  d42c539e367c66e9c88a801f6649349c21871b4344c6a573f849fdce62f314dd
 
 GOST("message digest") =
  ad4434ecb18f2c99b60cbe59ec3d2469582b65273f48de72db2fde16a4889a4d
 
 GOST( 128 characters of 'U' ) =
  53a3a3ed25180cef0c1d85a074273e551c25660a87062a52d926a9e8fe5733a4
 
 GOST( 1000000 characters of 'a' ) =
  5c00ccc2734cdd3332d3d4749576e3c1a7dbaf0e7ea74e9fa602413c90a129fa

Hashes for CryptoPro parameters
GOST algorithm with CryptoPro S-box generates different set of hash values.

 GOST("") = 981e5f3ca30c841487830f84fb433e13ac1101569b9c13584ac483234cd656c0
 
 GOST("a") = e74c52dd282183bf37af0079c9f78055715a103f17e3133ceff1aacf2f403011
 
 GOST("abc") = b285056dbf18d7392d7677369524dd14747459ed8143997e163b2986f92fd42c
 
 GOST("message digest") =
   bc6041dd2aa401ebfa6e9886734174febdb4729aa972d60f549ac39b29721ba0
 
 GOST("The quick brown fox jumps over the lazy dog") =
   9004294a361a508c586fe53d1f1b02746765e71b765472786e4770d565830a76
 
 GOST("ABCDEFGHIJKLMNOPQRSTUVWXYZabcdefghijklmnopqrstuvwxyz0123456789") =
   73b70a39497de53a6e08c67b6d4db853540f03e9389299d9b0156ef7e85d0f61
 
 GOST("12345678901234567890123456789012345678901234567890123456789012345678901234567890") =
   6bc7b38989b28cf93ae8842bf9d752905910a7528a61e5bce0782de43e610c90
 
 GOST("This is message, length=32 bytes") =
   2cefc2f7b7bdc514e18ea57fa74ff357e7fa17d652c75f69cb1be7893ede48eb
 
 GOST("Suppose the original message has length = 50 bytes") =
   c3730c5cbccacf915ac292676f21e8bd4ef75331d9405e5f1a61dc3130a65011
 
 GOST(128 of "U") = 1c4ac7614691bbf427fa2316216be8f10d92edfd37cd1027514c1008f649c4e8
 
 GOST(1000000 of "a") = 8693287aa62f9478f7cb312ec0866b6c4e4a0f11160441e8f4ffcd2715dd554f

See also 
 Kupyna
 Hash function security summary
 GOST standards
 List of hash functions

References

Further reading
 
  The full text of the GOST R 34.11-94 standard (in Russian).

External links
 C implementation and test vectors for GOST hash function from Markku-Juhani Saarinen, also contains draft translations into English of the GOST 28147-89 and GOST R 34.11-94 standards. Bugfixed version, see .
 C++ implementation with STL streams.
 RHash, an open source command-line tool, which can calculate and verify GOST hash (supports both parameter sets).
 Implementation of the GOST R 34.11-94 in JavaScript (CryptoPro parameters)
 The GOST Hash Function Ecrypt page
 Online GOST Calculator

Broken hash functions
Cryptographic hash functions
GOST standards